Abbas Abad (also Romanized as ‘Abbās Ābā; also known as ‘Abbāsābād) is a village in Meyami Rural District, in the Central District of Meyami County, Semnan Province, Iran. At the 2006 census, its population was 458, in 132 families.

References 

Populated places in Meyami County